Edgar Hugh Bacon (9 October 1887 – 16 December 1963) was an English freestyle and Greco-Roman sport wrestler who competed for Great Britain in the 1908 Summer Olympics, in the 1912 Summer Olympics, in the 1920 Summer Olympics, and in the 1924 Summer Olympics.

He was born in Camberwell. He was the brother of Ernest Bacon and Stanley Bacon.

In 1908 he finished fifth in the freestyle middleweight tournament and ninth in the Greco-Roman middleweight tournament. Four years later he was eliminated in the second round of the Greco-Roman middleweight category. At the 1920 Olympic, he finished ninth in the freestyle middleweight class. His final Olympic appearance was in 1924 when he finished eleventh in the freestyle middleweight tournament.

At the 1930 Empire Games, he won the silver medal in the light heavyweight class.

References

External links
 

1887 births
1963 deaths
Olympic wrestlers of Great Britain
Wrestlers at the 1908 Summer Olympics
Wrestlers at the 1912 Summer Olympics
Wrestlers at the 1920 Summer Olympics
Wrestlers at the 1924 Summer Olympics
British male sport wrestlers
Wrestlers at the 1930 British Empire Games
Commonwealth Games silver medallists for England
Sportspeople from London
Commonwealth Games medallists in wrestling
Medallists at the 1930 British Empire Games